Pescantina is a comune (municipality) in the Province of Verona in the Italian region Veneto, located about  west of Venice and about  northwest of Verona.

The municipality of Pescantina contains the frazioni (subdivisions, mainly villages and hamlets) Settimo, Balconi, Arcè, Ospedaletto, and Santa Lucia.

Pescantina borders the following municipalities: Bussolengo, Pastrengo, San Pietro in Cariano, Sant'Ambrogio di Valpolicella, and Verona.

Demographic evolution

Twin towns
Pescantina is twinned with:

  Siedlce, Poland, since 1993

References

External links
 www.comune.pescantina.vr.it/

Cities and towns in Veneto